The collared grosbeak (Mycerobas affinis) is a species of finch in the family Fringillidae.  Its range encompasses the northern regions of the Indian Subcontinent, mainly the Himalayas, along with some adjoining regions.  It is found in Bhutan, India, Myanmar, Nepal and Thailand. Its natural habitat is mountainous deciduous or mixed forests.

Description
The collared grosbeak may be the largest species in the diverse finch family, but several other species, including others in the genus Mycerobas, may rival it in size. Adult males are glossy black on the head, upper-wings and tail. Contrasting with the black head, the collar is an earthy brownish color. The rest of the male's plumage is a rich, deep yellow. The female is olive-green on back and yellowish below with no black about the face. The juvenile birds are fairly similar in appearance to the adult female.
 
The flight call of this bird is a mellow but rapid Pip-pip-pip-pip-uh. It is also known to utter a sharp alarm call, kurr. The male's song is a clear, loud and rising whistle consisting of five to six notes. The grosbeaks may utter a creaky groan in antagonistic interactions.

Phylogeny
The sister genera Eophona and Mycerobas form a clade.

Ecology
The collared grosbeak ranges from fairly common to scarce within its range. This grosbeak occurs in mixed and coniferous forests, commonly around stands of maple, oak or rhododendron. It also may occur during the summer in dwarf juniper above the tree line in the mountains. Pairs or small parties usually perch near the tops of tall trees but forage often in lower vegetation or even on the ground. The collared grosbeak flies in tight flocks in a fast, direct but sometimes undulating flying style. The breeding behavior of this species is unknown. The grosbeak feeds on a variety of seeds and pine cones as well as buds or shoots, nuts, fruits (including crab apples). A variety of this tough plant life is plucked with the strong bill. It may also feed on insects, mainly caterpillars, as well as snails.

References
Finches and Sparrows by Peter Clement. Princeton University Press (1999). .

collared grosbeak
Birds of North India
Birds of Nepal
Birds of Bhutan
Birds of Central China
Birds of Yunnan
collared grosbeak
collared grosbeak
Taxonomy articles created by Polbot